The 1949–50 Serie C was the twelfth edition of Serie C, the third highest league in the Italian football league system.

To reduce the groups into an 18-team formula, additional relegations were added during the season. However, the plan was later partially postponed.

Legend

Girone A
Northwest Italy

Girone B
Northeast Italy

Girone C
Central Italy

Girone D
Southern Italy

Serie C seasons
3
Italy